The Women's 800 metres competition at the 2012 Summer Olympics in London, United Kingdom. The event was held at the Olympic Stadium on 8–11 August. The race was won by  Mariya Savinova, but she has since been stripped of the gold medal for doping.

Doping

In 2013, Russian Elena Arzhakova (who ran sixth) was found to have violations in her biological passport and was suspended backdated to July 2011, disqualifying her from the race.

On November 9, 2015, the Independent Commission Investigation of the World Anti-Doping Agency asked for a lifetime ban for doping for the Russians Mariya Savinova (who won gold) and Ekaterina Poistogova (who won bronze). In February 2017, it was announced that Savinova was stripped of her gold medal. Poistogova was suspended in 2017 for 2 years, backdated to October 2014, but her London result is not affected.

Records
, the existing World and Olympic records were as follows.

Schedule

All times are British Summer Time (UTC+1)

Competition format

The Women's 800m competition consisted of heats (Round 1), semifinals and a final. Twenty-four athletes advanced from the heats to the semifinal round. The top three competitors from each of the six heats qualified for the semifinals along with the six fastest losers. A total of eight competitors qualified for the Final from the semifinals. In the three semifinal races, the first two from each semifinal advanced to the final along with the two fastest losers.

Race description

While heat 3 and heat 5 of the qualifying round allowed some athletes to run as slow as 2:07s or 2:08s and qualify, the semifinals were decidedly quicker.  In heat 1, Pamela Jelimo and Ekaterina Poistogova managed to qualify virtually together in mid 1:59s, those were the slowest times.  In heat two, 2009 World Champion Caster Semenya challenged the field, leading Elena Arzhakova, Janeth Jepkosgei Busienei and Alysia Johnson Montaño into the finals.  Halima Hachlaf ran 1:58.84 and didn't make the final.  In the third heat, virtual newcomer Francine Niyonsaba finished with 1:58.67 on the clock, a new national record for Burundi.

In the final, Montaño went to the front, with Jelimo and Jepkosgei Busienei on her shoulder, while Savinova and Semenya went to the back.  The front-running Montaño hit the halfway mark in 56.31.  Those positions held through 500 metres, when Jelimo charged out to a big lead down the back stretch, Montaño started to slow while Savinova started to move forward.  At the 600 metre line, there was a confluence of runners moving forward meeting those moving backward.  Savinova on the outside found herself in second place, though Jelimo had a 4-metre lead.  Semenya was behind the wall of runners.  In the next 100 metres, Savinova caught Jelimo, passing into the lead at the head of the straightaway and on to victory.  Semenya was a full 10 metres back, but on the outside of traffic.  As she went by, Montaño had slipped back to join a forward-moving Arzhakova.  As Semenya went by, Montaño accelerated enough to separate herself from Arzhakova and held that until the finish in what would ordinarily be an also-ran position of fifth place.  In the last 100, Semenya ran past the rest of the field, taking second place, but was too far behind to have a chance to catch Savinova; Poistogova edged a dying Jelimo for the bronze medal.

Result

Round 1

Qual. rule: first 3 of each heat (Q) plus the 6 fastest times (q) qualified.

Heat 1

Heat 2

Heat 3

Heat 4

Heat 5

Heat 6

Semifinals

Qual. rule: first 2 of each heat (Q) plus the 2 fastest times (q) qualified.

Heat 1

Heat 2

Heat 3

Final

References

Athletics at the 2012 Summer Olympics
800 metres at the Olympics
2012 in women's athletics
Women's events at the 2012 Summer Olympics